Star Trek: Klingon Empire is series of interlinked Klingon-centric Star Trek novels written by Keith DeCandido. The series was published by Pocket Books from 2003 to 2008.

Originally published as Star Trek: I.K.S. Gorkon.

Production 
Following positive reaction to his novel Diplomatic Implausibility (2001), DeCandido was curious if there was sufficient interest in a Klingon-centric series. In Voyages of Imagination (2009) by Jeff Ayers, DeCandido said "Pocket Books … was willing to take a chance." He had "already set it up" in Diplomatic Implausibility and The Brave and the Bold, Book 2 (2002), so he "took it forward" with two novels. A third novel followed in 2005.

In 2008, the series was relaunched as Klingon Empire. The scope of A Burning House was expanded beyond the crew aboard the Gorkon. The series ended with A Burning House.

Members of Gorkon crew appear in the Destiny (2008) miniseries, by David Mack, and in A Singular Destiny (2008), by DeCandido.

Flagship 
The  is a Qang-class, or Chancellor-class, war cruiser named for Chancellor Gorkon first introduced in The Undiscovered Country (1991). When launched, the Gorkon, was among the first of the Qang-class cruisers in service.

A Good Day to Die (2003) begins sometime after Chancellor Martok ordered the Gorkon to the Kavrot Sector—an unexplored region of space—with the objective of finding new planets to conquer for the glory of the Empire.

Captain Klag, captain of the Gorkon, was introduced in The Next Generation episode "A Matter of Honor".

Novels 
All novels written by Keith DeCandido.

I.K.S. Gorkon (2003–2005)

Klingon Empire (2008)

Short fiction 
Captain Klag's history was the subject of three short stories, with one set in the Mirror Universe. All were written by Keith DeCandido.

Related novels 
Novels that contain links to the series. The Gorkon and her crew were introduced in Diplomatic Implausibility (2003).

See also 
 Klingon
 Dominion War
 List of Star Trek novels
 List of Star Trek: Deep Space Nine novels
 List of Star Trek: The Next Generation novels

References

External links 
 
 

Book series introduced in 2003
Klingon Empire
Klingon Empire
Klingon Empire
Klingon Empire
Klingons
Science fiction book series